The 2017–18 Florida Panthers season was the 25th season for the National Hockey League franchise that was established on June 14, 1993. The Panthers missed the playoffs for the second straight season, despite recording 96 points, tied with the 2014–15 Boston Bruins and 2018–19 Montreal Canadiens for the most by a team to miss the playoffs.

Standings

Schedule and results

Preseason
The preseason schedule was released on June 9, 2017.

Regular season
The regular season schedule was published on June 22, 2017.

Player statistics
As of April 9, 2018

Skaters

Goaltenders

†Denotes player spent time with another team before joining the Panthers. Statistics reflect time with the Panthers only.
‡Denotes player was traded mid-season. Statistics reflect time with the Panthers only.
Bold denotes season record.

Transactions
The Panthers have been involved in the following transactions during the 2017–18 season.

Trades

Free agents acquired

Free agents lost

Claimed via waivers

Lost via waivers

Lost via retirement

Player signings

Draft picks

Below are the Florida Panthers' selections at the 2017 NHL Entry Draft, which was held on June 23 and 24, 2017 at the United Center in Chicago.

Draft notes:
 The Arizona Coyotes' third-round pick went to the Florida Panthers as the result of a trade on August 25, 2016, that sent Dave Bolland and Lawson Crouse to Arizona in exchange for a conditional second-round pick in 2018 and this pick (being conditional at the time of the trade). The condition – Florida will receive the better of Arizona or Detroit's third-round picks in 2017 – was converted on March 29, 2017, when Detroit clinched a better regular season record than Arizona for the 2016–17 NHL season.
 The Anaheim Ducks' sixth-round pick went to the Florida Panthers as the result of a trade on December 4, 2014, that sent Colby Robak to Anaheim in exchange for Jesse Blacker and this pick (being conditional at the time of the trade). The condition — Florida will receive a sixth-round pick in 2017 dependent on how many games Robak played for Anaheim during the 2014–15 NHL season — the date of conversion is unknown.

References

Florida Panthers seasons
Florida Panthers
Florida Panthers
Florida Panthers